Christian Ernest Dior (21 January 1905 – 24 October 1957) was a French fashion designer, best known as the founder of one of the world's top fashion houses, Christian Dior SE, which is now owned by parent company LVMH. His fashion houses are known all around the world, specifically "on five continents in only a decade" (Sauer).

Dior's skills led to his employment and design for various fashion icons in attempts to preserve the fashion industry during World War II. Post-war, he founded and established the Dior fashion house, with his collection of the "New Look". 

Throughout his lifetime, he won numerous awards for Best Costume Design. Upon his death in 1957, various contemporary icons paid tribute to his life and work.

Early life

Christian Dior was born in Granville, a seaside town on the coast of Normandy, France. He was the second of five children born to Maurice Dior, a wealthy fertilizer manufacturer (the family firm was Dior Frères), and his wife, formerly Madeleine Martin. He had four siblings: Raymond (father of Françoise Dior), Jacqueline, Bernard, and Catherine Dior. When Christian was about five years old, the family moved to Paris, but still returned to the Normandy coast for summer holidays.

Dior's family had hoped he would become a diplomat, but Dior wished to be involved in art. To make money, he sold his fashion sketches outside his house for about 10 cents each. In 1928, Dior left school and received money from his father to finance a small art gallery, where he and a friend sold art by the likes of Pablo Picasso. The gallery was closed three years later, following the deaths of Dior's mother and brother, as well as financial trouble during the Great Depression that resulted in his father losing control of the family business.

From 1937, Dior was employed by the fashion designer Robert Piguet, who gave him the opportunity to design for three Piguet collections. Dior would later say that "Robert Piguet taught me the virtues of simplicity through which true elegance must come." One of his original designs for Piguet, a day dress with a short, full skirt called "Cafe Anglais", was particularly well received. Whilst at Piguet, Dior worked alongside Pierre Balmain, and was succeeded as house designer by Marc Bohan – who would, in 1960, become head of design for Christian Dior Paris. Dior left Piguet when he was called up for military service.

In 1942, when Dior left the army, he joined the fashion house of Lucien Lelong, where he and Balmain were the primary designers. For the duration of World War II, Dior, as an employee of Lelong, designed dresses for the wives of Nazi officers and French collaborators, as did other fashion houses that remained in business during the war, including Jean Patou, Jeanne Lanvin, and Nina Ricci. His sister, Catherine (1917–2008), served as a member of the French Resistance, was captured by the Gestapo, and sent to the Ravensbrück concentration camp, where she was incarcerated until her liberation in May 1945. In 1947, he named his debut fragrance, Miss Dior in tribute to his sister.

The Dior fashion house

In 1946, Marcel Boussac, a successful entrepreneur, invited Dior to design for Philippe et Gaston, a Paris fashion house launched in 1925. Dior refused, wishing to make a fresh start under his own name rather than reviving an old brand. In 1946, with Boussac's backing, Dior founded his fashion house. The name of the line of his first collection, presented on 12 February 1947, was Corolle (literally the botanical term corolla or circlet of flower petals in English). The phrase New Look was coined for it by Carmel Snow, the editor-in-chief of Harper's Bazaar.

Despite being called "New", it was clearly drawn from styles of the Edwardian era. The New Look merely refined and crystallized trends in skirt shape and waistline that had been burgeoning in high fashion since the late 1930s. Dior's designs were more voluptuous than the boxy, fabric-conserving shapes of the recent World War II styles, influenced by the wartime rationing of fabric. 

The "New Look" revolutionized women's dress and reestablished Paris as the centre of the fashion world after World War II, as well as making Dior a virtual arbiter of fashion for much of the following decade. Each season featuring a newly titled Dior "line", in the manner of 1947's "Corolle" line, that would then be trumpeted in the fashion press: the Envol and Cyclone/Zigzag lines in 1948; the Trompe l'Oeil and Mid-Century lines in 1949; the Vertical and Oblique lines in 1950; the Naturelle/Princesse and Longue lines in 1951; the Sinueuse and Profilėe lines in 1952; the Tulipe and Vivante lines in 1953; the Muguet/Lily of the Valley line and H-Line in 1954; the A-Line and Y-Line in 1955; the Flèche/Arrow and Aimant/Magnet lines in 1956; and the Libre/Free and Fuseau/Spindle lines in 1957, followed by successor Yves Saint Laurent's Trapeze line in 1958.

In 1955, the 19-year-old Yves Saint Laurent became Dior's design assistant. Dior told Yves Saint Laurent's mother in 1957 that he had chosen Saint Laurent to succeed him at Dior. She indicated later that she had been confused by the remark, as Dior was only 52 at the time.

Death
Dior died of a sudden heart attack while on vacation in Montecatini, Italy, on 24 October 1957 in the late afternoon while playing a game of cards.

Awards and honors

Dior was nominated for the 1955 Academy Award for Best Costume Design in black and white for the Terminal Station directed by Vittorio De Sica (1953). Dior was also nominated in 1967 for a BAFTA for Best British Costume (Colour) for the Arabesque directed by Stanley Donen (1966). Nominated in 1986 for his contributions to the 1985 film, Bras de fer, he was up for Best Costume Design (Meilleurs costumes) during the 11th Cesar Awards.

Cultural references

A novella by Paul Gallico, Mrs 'Arris Goes to Paris (1958, UK title Flowers for Mrs Harris), tells the story of a London charwoman who falls in love with her employer's couture wardrobe and goes to Paris to purchase a Dior ballgown. A perfume named Christian Dior is used in Haruki Murakami's novel The Wind-Up Bird Chronicle as an influential symbol placed at critical plot points throughout. The English singer-songwriter Morrissey released a song titled "Christian Dior" as a B-side to his 2006 single "In the Future When All's Well". Kanye West released a song titled "Christian Dior Denim Flow" in 2010. West mentioned the Dior brand in three other songs: "Devil in a New Dress", "Stronger", and "Barry Bonds". 

The late American rapper Pop Smoke released a song titled "Dior" in July 2019. Pop Smoke also mentioned the Dior brand in other songs, including "Enjoy Yourself": "Shopping up in Saks Fifth with a cup of Actavis to get Christian Dior; Look, I be all up in the stores (Oh, oh)." 

In 2016, book publisher Assouline introduced an ongoing series devoted to each designer of the couture house of Dior. Published titles include Dior by Christian Dior, Dior by YSL, Dior by Marc Bohan, and Dior by Gianfranco Ferre.

See also 
 Château de La Colle Noire

References

Further reading
Charleston, Beth Duncuff (October 2004). "Christian Dior (1905–1957)". Heilbrunn Timeline of Art History. New York: The Metropolitan Museum of Art. Based on original work by Harold Koda.
Dior, Christian (1957). Christian Dior and I. New York: Dutton.
Garcia-Moreau, Guillaume, Le château de La Colle Noire, un art de vivre en Provence, Dior, 2018. Read online
Martin, Richard; Koda, Harold (1996). Christian Dior. New York: The Metropolitan Museum of Art. .

External links

Photos of Dior and Samples of New Look Fashion
 
Documentary film Christian Dior, The Man Behind The Myth
Christian Dior at Chicago History Museum Digital Collections 

1905 births
1957 deaths
People from Manche
French fashion designers
LGBT fashion designers
French LGBT artists
French military personnel of World War II
Collège Stanislas de Paris alumni
Dior people
20th-century French LGBT people